Hill topping may refer to:

 Hill-topping (biology), a mate-location behaviour seen in many insects including butterflies, dragonflies, wasps, beetles, and flies
 Hill jumping, the act of accelerating a motor vehicle as it approaches the top of a hill, causing the vehicle to go airborne
 Hilltopping, a fox hunt by horse but without jumping or in an automobile

See also
 Hilltop (disambiguation)